Šúrovce is a village and municipality of Trnava District in the Trnava region of Slovakia.

References

External links
http://en.e-obce.sk/obec/sturovce/surovce.html
http://www.statistics.sk/mosmis/eng/run.html
http://www.surovce.sk/ 

Villages and municipalities in Trnava District